Kim Elizabeth Richards (born 31 August 1971) is an Australian politician. She has been the Labor member for Redlands in the Queensland Legislative Assembly since 2017. Richards holds the seat of Redlands with a margin of 3.06 percent

References

External links
Parliamentary Profile

1971 births
Living people
Members of the Queensland Legislative Assembly
Australian Labor Party members of the Parliament of Queensland
Women members of the Queensland Legislative Assembly
21st-century Australian politicians
21st-century Australian women politicians